Cathedral Mountain is a  elevation Navajo Sandstone summit located in Zion National Park, in Washington County of southwest Utah, United States.

Description
Other neighbors include The Great White Throne, Observation Point, The Organ, Lady Mountain, Cable Mountain, and parent Mount Majestic. This feature's descriptive name was applied by Stephen S. Johnson in 1922, and officially adopted in 1934 by the U.S. Board on Geographic Names. The Spearhead, elevation 5,804-ft, is the southernmost tip of this mountain, and is prominently featured from Zion Lodge. The first ascent of Cathedral was made by Walter Becker, Fritz Becker, and Rudolph Weidner on August 31, 1931.

Climate
Spring and fall are the most favorable seasons to visit Cathedral Mountain. According to the Köppen climate classification system, it is located in a Cold semi-arid climate zone, which is defined by the coldest month having an average mean temperature below , and at least 50% of the total annual precipitation being received during the spring and summer.

Gallery

See also

 List of mountains in Utah
 Geology of the Zion and Kolob canyons area
 Colorado Plateau

References

External links

 Zion National Park National Park Service
 Weather forecast: Cathedral Mountain
 Cathedral Mountain Rock Climbing: mountainproject.com

Mountains of Utah
Zion National Park
Mountains of Washington County, Utah
Sandstone formations of the United States
North American 2000 m summits